A bar or stroke is a modification consisting of a line drawn through a grapheme. It may be used as a diacritic to derive new letters from old ones, or simply as an addition to make a grapheme more distinct from others. It can take the form of a vertical bar, slash, or crossbar.

A stroke is sometimes drawn through the numerals 7 (horizontal overbar) and 0 (overstruck foreslash), to make them more distinguishable from the number 1 and the letter O, respectively.

For the specific usages of various letters with bars and strokes, see their individual articles.

Letters with bar

Currency signs with bar

Currency symbols and letters with double bar

See also
 Strikethrough
 X-bar theory (formal linguistics)
 Parallel (operator)

References

External links
Diacritics Project: All you need to design a font with correct accents
Orthographic diacritics

Diacritics
Diakrytyka
Latin-script diacritics